The badminton competition at the 1998 Commonwealth Games took place at the Kuala Lumpur Badminton Stadium in Kuala Lumpur, Malaysia from 11 September until 21 September 1998. There were no bronze medal play off matches because both losing semi-finalists were awarded a bronze medal.

Medal table

Final results

Singles results

Men's singles

Women's singles

Doubles results

Men's doubles

Women's doubles

Mixed doubles

Team results

Men's team

 England & New Zealand both awarded bronze

Women's team

 India & Australia both awarded bronze

Team medallists

References

External links
 Athletes' Profile

1998 Commonwealth Games events
1998
Commonwealth Games
Commonwealth Games